Submit to Selfdestruction is a 1998 EP record by Swedish black metal band Shining, the band's first release. It is a black 7 inch pressing limited to 300 handnumbered copies. Kvarforth was 14 years old when Submit to Selfdestruction was released. The tracks on this EP also appear on Through Years of Oppression.

Track listing

Personnel
 Wraith (Niklas Kvarforth) - guitar, bass guitar
 Robert Ayddan - vocals
 Impaler (Ted Wedebrand) - drums

References

1998 EPs
Shining (Swedish band) albums